The afghani (sign:  or Af (plural: Afs) code: AFN;) is the currency of Afghanistan. It is nominally subdivided into 100 puls (پول), although there are no pul coins currently in circulation. The issuance of the currency is managed solely by the nation's central bank, Da Afghanistan Bank. The afghani is informally referred to as rūpah by the general Afghanese public in conversing and transactions, a legacy of its predecessing Afghan rupee currency.

History

First Afghani (1925–2002)

The original afghani (ISO 4217 code: AFA) was introduced in 1925 during the era of Ghazi Amanullah Khan, replacing the Afghan rupee that was used from 1891. In addition to being subdivided into 100 puls, 20 afghanis were equal to one amani. The rate of conversion from the rupee is sometimes quoted as 1 afghani = 1 rupee 6 paisas, based on the silver contents of the last rupee coins and the first afghani coins. The afghani initially contained 9 grams of silver. Alongside the new currency, the various units of weight used in Afghanistan were replaced by a single metric system.

Except during World War I, Afghanistan's foreign exchange rate has been freely determined by market forces. However, for some periods, a dual exchange rate regime existed in Afghanistan: an official exchange rate which was fixed by the Afghan Central Bank, and a free market exchange rate which was determined by the supply and demand forces in Kabul's money bazaar called Saraye Shahzada. For example, in order to avoid the seasonal fluctuations in the exchange rate, a fixed exchange rate was adopted in 1935 by the Bank-e-Millie (National Bank), which was then responsible for the country's exchange rate system and official reserves. Bank-e-Millie agreed to exchange afghani at Afs. 4 against 1 Indian rupee in 1935. After the establishment of Da Afghanistan Bank as the Central Bank of Afghanistan, such a preferential official fixed exchange rate continued to be practiced. Although Da Afghanistan Bank tried to keep its official rate close to the Sarai Shahzada exchange rate, the gap between the official and free-market exchange rates widened in the 1980s and during the civil war thereafter.

The afghani traded at Afs. 67 to one US dollar in 1973. After the start of a civil war in 1992, the same US dollar bought Afs. 16,000. Banknotes from the period of Zahir Shah's monarchy ceased to be legal tender by 1991. After the creation of a dysfunctional government and the start of the civil war, different warlords and factions, foreign powers and forgers each made their own afghani banknotes to support themselves financially, with no regard to standardization or honoring serial numbers.

In December 1996, shortly after the Taliban took control of Afghanistan's institutions, Ehsanullah Ehsan, the chairman of the Taliban's Central Bank, declared most afghani notes in circulation to be worthless (approximately 100 trillion Afghani) and cancelled the contract with the Russian firm that had been printing the currency since 1992. Ehsan accused the firm of sending new shipments of afghani notes to ousted President Burhanuddin Rabbani in northern Takhar province. The exchange rate at the time of Ehsan's announcement was Afs. 21,000 to one US dollar. It was then devalued to Afs. 43,000 to the dollar. Abdul Rashid Dostum, who controlled a self-declared autonomous region in northern Afghanistan until 1998, also printed his own money for his region.

Following the United States intervention, the currency became highly destabilized. The afghani traded at Afs. 73,000 per US$1 in September 2001, steeply soaring to Afs. 23,000 after the fall of the Taliban regime in December 2001, before plunging again to Afs. 36,000 in January 2002. Around seven different versions of the currency were in circulation by that time. A former governor said at the time that maybe "trillions" of banknotes are in circulation as a result.

Second Afghani (2002–present)
In 2002, the afghani was redenominated, and it received a new ISO 4217 code AFN. No subdivisions were issued. It replaced the previous afghani at two distinct rates: issues of the government of former President Rabbani (de jure 1992–2001) were replaced at a rate of 1,000 to the new afghani, whilst the issues of warlord Dostum (1992–1997 in northern Afghanistan) were replaced at a rate of 2,000 to the new afghani. It was created in an effort to stabilize the economy and stop the rapid inflation. The notes were printed in Germany.

The new currency was announced by President Hamid Karzai on 4 September 2002, and was introduced to the market on October 8, 2002. This monetary reform was well received by the public as it was a sign of security and stability, especially the country's rebuilding effort. People also no longer had to carry many bags of money for ordinary things. It was the first time in many years that a sole currency was under the control of the central bank instead of warlords. Most old banknotes were destroyed by the end of 2002.

Da Afghanistan Bank has adopted a floating exchange rate regime and has let the exchange rate be determined freely by market forces. The new afghani was valued at Afs. 43 to one US dollar.

After depreciating during the last quarter of 2003/04, the afghani appreciated steadily, gaining 8 per cent against the US dollar between March 2004 and July 2004. This appreciation, at a time of increasing inflation, appears to reflect a greater willingness by the population to use the afghani as a medium of exchange and as a store of value. This trend appears to be attributable to the relative stability of the exchange rate since the introduction of the new currency, administrative measures aimed at promoting its use, such as the requirement that shopkeepers must price goods in afghani. Donors are increasingly making payments in afghanis instead of US dollars and this appears to be widely accepted. By 2009, the afghani was valued at Afs. 45 per one US dollar. In 2019, the afghani reached Afs. 75 to the US dollar.

After the Taliban took over in 2021, Afghanistan's foreign assets were frozen. IMF blocked the release of $450 million in August. Subsequently, the value of the afghani fell. The Taliban banned all foreign currencies to encourage use of the afghani as national tender.

Coinage
In 1952, aluminium 25 pul and nickel-clad steel 50 pul were introduced, followed by aluminium Afs. 2 and Afs. 5 in 1958. In 1961 nickel-clad steel Af. 1, Afs. 2 and Afs. 5 were minted; the Af. 1 and Afs. 2 coins show years of SH 1340 and the Afs. 5 coin shows the year AH 1381. A number of commemorative coins were also issued by the Islamic State of Afghanistan between 1995 and 2001.

On 11 April 2005, coins were introduced in denominations of Af. 1, Afs. 2 and Afs. 5.

Banknotes

Between 1925 and 1928, Treasury notes were introduced in denominations of Afs. 5, Afs. 10 and Afs. 50. In 1936, Afs. 2, Afs. 20 and Afs. 100 notes were added. The Bank of Afghanistan (Da Afghanistan Bank) took over paper money production in 1939, issuing notes for Afs. 2, Afs. 5, Afs. 10, Afs. 20, Afs. 50, Afs. 100, Afs. 500 and Afs. 1,000. The Afs. 2 and Afs. 5 notes were replaced by coins in 1958. In 1993, Afs. 5,000 and Afs. 10,000 notes were introduced.

"A 'pothole cave' or 'mouth of a shaft' (or Pit cave) is said to be visible on the Afs. 10,000 banknote from 1993 as a limited dark area in the hillside above the ancient 'pol' or gateway at the ruins near Lashkar Gah. This is possibly the entrance to one of the man-made undergrounds at Qala-e-Bost."

On 7 October 2002, banknotes were introduced in denominations of Af. 1, Afs. 2, Afs. 5, Afs. 10, Afs. 20, Afs. 50, Afs. 100, Afs. 500, and Afs. 1,000. The Af. 1, Afs. 2 and Afs. 5 notes were replaced by coins in 2005. In 2004 and 2008, the security features on several denominations were improved. In 2014 a new Afs. 1,000 note was introduced to prevent counterfeit notes.

Exchange rate
The Afghani exchange rate vis-à-vis the U.S. dollar since 1950 has been shown in the following table:

References

Further reading

External links

Afghanistan's paper money
Ancient banknotes of Afghanistan
Ministry of Finance, Afghanistan
Afghan Afghani Exchange Rates
Afghanistan Coins Catalog

Currencies of Afghanistan
Currencies introduced in 1925